In Italy, the driving licence is a governmental right given to those who request a licence for any of the categories they choose. It is required for every type of motorized vehicle. The minimum age to obtain a driving licence is as follows:
 16 years for a motorcycle of 125cc with a limit of motor power of 11 kW; a quadricycle motor (cars with a weight of 400 kg – 550 kg if it is for freight transport) and a motor power not exceeding 15 kW)
 18 years for a car or motorcycle without a limit for the engine cylinder capacity and a limit of motor power of 35 kW
 21 years for minibuses, three-wheelers without a limit of motor power, and cargo vehicles
 24 years for motorcycles without limits of motor power; buses

The so-called "patentino" (small driving licence) was an Italian licence given to young people with a minimum age of 14 years. This licence permitted teenagers to drive scooters and "micro-cars" (small cars with a maximum motor power of 4 kW and a maximum speed of 45 km/h). In 2013, this was replaced with a new category of driver's licence.

Obtaining a driver's licence
The Italian driving licence can be obtained after finishing a driver's education course and passing a two-stage test: a theory test and a driving test. An elementary school diploma is also required to obtain a valid driving licence.

In order to pass the theory test, an applicant cannot make more than three mistakes on a total of thirty questions related to road signs and street code articles. The test is timed and must be completed in twenty minutes. A failed theory test can be retaken once. After passing the theory test, the applicant receives a foglio rosa (learner's permit) that allows them to drive accompanied by an adult with ten or more years of driving experience. The permit is valid for twelve months, within which a driving test must be taken. A failed driving test can be retaken twice (three attempts overall).

See also
 European driving licence
 Vehicle registration plates of Italy
 Italian identity card
 Italian passport

References

Italy
Road transport in Italy